spodchmurykapelusza ("From Under the Cloud of a Hat") is the final studio album by Czesław Niemen released in 2001.

Track listing 
 "Spokojnym krokiem" - 3:41
 "Trąbodzwonnik" - 3:11
 "Nie wyszeptuj" - 3:10
 "Śmiech Megalozaura" - 5:25
 "Jagody szaleju" - 3:50
 "Pojutrze szary pył" - 3:21
 "Sonancja" - 4:13
 "Manhattan '93" - 3:32
 "Co po nas" - 3:36
 "Doloniedola" - 4:04
 "Antropocosmicus" - 4:41
 "Spodchmurykapelusza" - 4:01

All music and lyrics by Czesław Niemen.

Personnel 
Czesław Niemen - vocal, electronic instruments

Czesław Niemen albums
2001 albums
Electronic albums by Polish artists